Hodoyoshi-4 is a Japanese micro-satellite launched in 2014. The satellite is built in 0.5x0.6x0.7m box-shape bus, optimized for piggy-back launch.
All instruments are powered by solar cells mounted on the spacecraft body and two stub wings, with estimated electrical power of 50W. For orbit-keeping, a "miniature" (5 kg dry weight) ion thruster with specific impulse 1100s and operating power 20W is integrated into the body. The satellite was developed under the Funding Program for World-Leading Innovation R&D on Science and Technology.

Launch
Hodoyoshi-4 was launched from Dombarovsky (air base) site 13, Russia, on 19 June 2014 by a Dnepr rocket. Two-side communication with Earth was successfully achieved at 2nd pass over ground station.

Mission
The satellite is intended primarily for technology verification in space, main test piece being Earth observation telescope with nominal 6.7m GSD at 650 km altitude. 

Secondary mission is measurements of water level in rivers to monitor floods by using Store&Forward System. Third mission is Hosted Payload. Hosted Payload mission consisted of 10 cm-cubic boxes on which users could install their own apparatuses for their own applications. Project members asked users in private partnership in order to explore new market of satellite utilization. One of the apparatuses was space message display system. Electronic message display was installed which operators could change characters on the display by sending commands from the ground station. Users can take photos of their messages with the view of the earth from the window.

See also

 2014 in spaceflight
 Hodoyoshi 3

References

External links
 
 Nano-Satellite Center, University of Tokyo
 Hodoyoshi and UNIFORM satellites tracking

Earth observation satellites of Japan
University of Tokyo
Spacecraft launched in 2014
Spacecraft launched by Dnepr rockets